Sjan van Dijk (born 4 February 1964) is a Dutch archer. She competed in the women's individual and team events at the 1992 Summer Olympics.

References

1964 births
Living people
Dutch female archers
Olympic archers of the Netherlands
Archers at the 1992 Summer Olympics
Sportspeople from North Brabant
20th-century Dutch women